Pseudogobio vaillanti is a species of cyprinid endemic to China.

Although patronym not identified but clearly in honor of Sauvage’s colleague, zoologist Léon Vaillant (1834-1914).

References

Pseudogobio
Taxa named by Henri Émile Sauvage
Fish described in 1878